Viktor Yosypovych Matchuk (born 5 June 1959, Rivne, Ukraine) is a Ukrainian electrical engineer and later politician, member of the Verkhovna Rada.

In 1992-2006 he worked as a director at the "Renome" company.

In 2006-2010 Matchuk served as a Governor of Rivne Oblast.

In 2010-2012 he was a member of the Verkhovna Rada representing Our Ukraine.

References

External links
 Profile at the Official Ukraine Today portal

1959 births
Living people
Politicians from Rivne
Kyiv Polytechnic Institute alumni
Ukrainian electrical engineers
Governors of Rivne Oblast
Sixth convocation members of the Verkhovna Rada
Our Ukraine (political party) politicians